NGC 6452, also occasionally referred to as PGC 60876 or GC 5878, is a lenticular galaxy in the constellation Hercules. It was discovered on 2 July 1864 by astronomer Albert Marth.

See also 
 List of NGC objects (6001-7000)

References

External links 
 
 SEDS

Lenticular galaxies
Hercules (constellation)
06452
60876
Astronomical objects discovered in 1864
Discoveries by Albert Marth